"Taste of Your Love" is a 1989 single released by the Washington, D.C.-based go-go band Experience Unlimited.  The song was released as the second single from their 1989 album Livin' Large. The single peaked at #4 on Billboard's "Hot R&B/Hip-Hop songs" chart, on September 16, 1989.

Track listing

A-Side
"Taste of Your Love" (LP Version) – 5:55
"Taste of Your Love" (Instrumental) – 5:54

B-Side
"Da Butt '89" – 5:28

References

1989 songs
Experience Unlimited songs
Virgin Records singles
New jack swing songs